The EWA Heavyweight Championship is a professional wrestling heavyweight championship in the Eastern Wrestling Alliance (EWA). It has been defended throughout the New England region since its introduction in 1998, specifically, in Connecticut, Maine, Massachusetts, New Hampshire, and Rhode Island.

The inaugural champion was "Big" Rick Fuller, who was awarded the title by the promotion's executive committee to become the first EWA Heavyweight Champion. Maverick Wild holds the record for most reigns, with three. At 742 days, Maverick Wild's third reign is the longest in the title's history. Mikaze's second reign was the shortest in the history of the title losing it to Sean Burke moments after winning the vacant championship. Overall, there have been 24 reigns shared between 18 wrestlers with six vacancies.

Title history
Key

Reigns

References
General

Specific

External links
EWAprowrestling.com
Joel's EWA Site

Heavyweight wrestling championships